The 1980 Volvo Women's Cup was a women's tennis tournament played on outdoor hard courts at the Ramapo College in Mahwah, New Jersey in the United States, It was part of the Colgate Series circuit of the 1980 WTA Tour and classified as a category AA event. It was the third edition of the tournament and was held from August 18 through August 24, 1980. Fifth-seeded Hana Mandlíková won the singles title and earned $20,000 first-prize money.

Finals

Singles
 Hana Mandlíková defeated  Andrea Jaeger 6–7(0–7), 6–2, 6–2
It was Mandlíková's 1st singles title of the year and the 8th of her career.

Doubles
 Martina Navratilova /  Candy Reynolds defeated  Pam Shriver /  Betty Stöve 4–6, 6–3, 6–1

Prize money

Notes

References

External links
 ITF tournament edition details

Virginia Slims of New Jersey
WTA New Jersey
1980 in sports in New Jersey
1980 in American tennis